Babe Herman (April 15, 1902 – 1966) was an American featherweight boxer.

Born as Herman J. Sousa in Sacramento, California, he stood 5' 4". His record was 91 (KO 23) wins + 45 (KO 9) losses + 19 draws.

On December 18, 1925, he challenged Louis "Kid" Kaplan for the featherweight title at Madison Square Garden, losing in a fifteen-round decision.

 His managers were Jack Kearns, Dan McKetrick, and Fred Pearl. He boxed a total of 1269 rounds in a total 167 bouts.

References

External links
New York Times article (pay to read)

1902 births
1966 deaths
Boxers from California
Date of death unknown
Boxers from New York City
Boxers from Sacramento, California
Featherweight boxers
American male boxers
Place of death missing